Burn, Baby, Burn! is the debut album by American industrial rock band The Electric Hellfire Club. Released on October 25, 1993 by Cleopatra Records, following Thomas Thorn's departure from My Life With The Thrill Kill Kult, the album's lyrical theme ranges from satanism, drugs, sex, psychedelia to Ricky Kasso, the Son of Sam, and Charles Manson.

Track listing
"Invocation / Age of Fire" - 07:50
"Psychedelic Sacrifice" - 05:33
"Fall From Grace" - 07:06
"Prodigal Son (A Libertine's Lament)" - 05:20
"Mr. 44" - 04:36
"Where Violence Is Golden..." - 06:09
"The Electric Hellfire Acid Test" - 05:38
"Epitaph" - 06:02
"Black Bus" - 05:22

Personnel
Thomas Thorn – vocals, programming
Shane "Rev. Dr. Luv" Lassen – keyboards
Sabrina Satana – dancer, backing vocals
Ronny Valeo – guitars
Richard Frost – drums

Notes
The album's cover artwork was inspired by the church burnings in Norway during the early 90s.

References

1993 albums
The Electric Hellfire Club albums
Cleopatra Records albums
Industrial rock albums
Industrial dance albums